Parvati River is a river in the Parvati Valley in Himachal Pradesh, northern India that flows into the Beas River at Bhuntar, some 10 km south of Kullu. It rises from the Man Talai Glacier below the Pin Parbati Pass and flows in a gradual curve from north-northwest to west-southwest past the important temple town of Manikaran.

The river valley has been a route to various places: Lahul across the Sara Umga La pass, Spiti across the famous Pin Parbati Pass, and the recently discovered (1995) Debsa Pass. The river has fine first-growth forests in its upper reaches which are being degraded as a consequence of development of its vast hydro-electric potential.  There are geothermal springs on the banks of the river at Manikaran and Kheerganga.

Gallery

External links

References

Rivers of Himachal Pradesh
Geography of Kullu district
Indus basin
Rivers of India